Glen Echo is a rural locality in the Gympie Region, Queensland, Australia. In the  Glen Echo had a population of 31 people.

Geography
Sugar Loaf Mountain is in the far north of the locality .

History 
A bridge crossing Munna Creek was washed away in 1933, and a temporary crossing provided by Councillor Sauer until a new bridge was built. In early 1935 a new bridge was opened with 300 people present for the event. The bridge was named Sauer's Bridge as a recognition of Councillor W. Sauer's war services and his efforts to have the bridge constructed.  The bridge has since been replaced by a cement bridge.

In the  Glen Echo had a population of 31 people.

References 

Gympie Region
Localities in Queensland